Hilarographa iquitosana is a species of moth of the family Tortricidae. It is found in Peru.

The wingspan is about 19 mm. The ground colour of the forewings is orange, but cream in the in costal part, consisting of slender strips separated from one another by broad brown fasciae. The hindwings are white in the costal, submedian and anal parts. The remaining area is dark brown.

Etymology
The species name refers to the type locality.

References

Moths described in 2009
Hilarographini